Emre Demir (born 15 January 2004) is a Turkish professional footballer who plays as a midfielder for Turkish club Samsunspor, on loan from Fenerbahçe.

Club career

Early career 
Demir started playing football with his local club Mersin at the age of 6, and moved to Kayserispor 2 years later. As a youth talent, he attended trials at Barcelona and Paris Saint-Germain.

Kayserispor 
On 18 January 2019, Demir signed his first professional contract with Kayserispor aged 15. One week after his 15th birthday, Demir made his professional debut with Kayserispor in a 0-0 Turkish Cup tie with Akhisarspor on 22 January 2019, playing the final three minutes of the match. He became the youngest goalscorer in Süper Lig history when he scored against Gençlerbirliği S.K. on 9 November 2019, aged 15 years and 299 days.

Barcelona 
On 23 September 2021, Barcelona Atlètic announced an agreement with Kayserispor to sign Demir for the 2022–23 season for a fee of 2 million euros. On 14 July 2022, Demir signed a five-year deal, with a buyout clause of €400 million.

Fenerbahçe
Having not managed to break through Barcelona's team consistently, on 31 January 2023 Demir returned to Turkey, joining Süper Lig club Fenerbahçe on a free transfer and signing a four-and-a-half-year deal.

On 3 February 2023, he was loaned to TFF First League club Samsunspor, until the end of the season.

Club statistics

References

External links
 
 
 
 

2004 births
Living people
Sportspeople from Mersin
Turkish footballers
Turkey youth international footballers
Turkish expatriate footballers
Turkish expatriate sportspeople in Spain
Expatriate footballers in Spain
Kayserispor footballers
FC Barcelona Atlètic players
Fenerbahçe S.K. footballers
Samsunspor footballers
Süper Lig players
Primera Federación players
Association football midfielders
21st-century Turkish sportswomen